The 2009 Fukuoka SoftBank Hawks season featured the Hawks quest to win their first Pacific League title since 2003.  For the first time since 1994, the Hawks had a new manager in Koji Akiyama, who replaced the legendary Sadaharu Oh.

SoftBank absorbed more injuries from Opening Day starter Tsuyoshi Wada, but saw the continued dominance of Toshiya Sugiuchi, and the emergence of foreign pitchers D.J. Houlton and Justin Germano, who stabilized the starting rotation.  More foreign help came in the person of 201 cm-tall reliever Brian Falkenborg.  Together with Rookie of the Year Tadashi Settsu and closer Takahiro Mahara, the Hawks had one of the most reliable bullpens in the league.

The Hawks had one of the older offenses in the league, still anchored by Nobuhiko Matsunaka and Hiroki Kokubo.  Yuya Hasegawa had a breakout season (.312, 7HR, 44RBI) after suffering injuries in the previous two seasons.  Hitoshi Tamura came back in mid-May and hit .283 with 17 home runs, which helped to make up for a disappointing season from Munenori Kawasaki, who batted a career-low .259 despite career highs in games played (143) and stolen bases (44).

For the second year in a row, the Hawks won the Interleague tournament.  However, the team could not sustain their success as they stumbled in September, finishing 3rd and exiting in the first round of the playoffs, at the hands of the rival Tohoku Rakuten Golden Eagles.

Regular season

Standings

Game log

|-align="center" bgcolor="bbffbb"
| 1 || April 3 || Buffaloes || 8 - 0 || Wada (1-0) || Komatsu (0-1) ||  || 30,106 || 1-0-0
|-align="center" bgcolor="#ffbbbb"
| 2 || April 4 || Buffaloes || 2 - 5 || Kondo (1-0) || Oba (0-1) || Kato (1) || 28,827 || 1-1-0
|-align="center" bgcolor="bbffbb"
| 3 || April 5 || Buffaloes || 2 - 1 (10) || Kamiuchi (1-0) || Kawagoe (0-1) ||  || 29,576 || 2-1-0
|-align="center" bgcolor="#ffbbbb"
| 4 || April 7 || @Eagles || 6 - 0 || Tanaka (1-0) || Loe (0-1) ||  || 17,281 || 2-2-0
|-align="center" bgcolor="bbffbb"
| 5 || April 8 || @Eagles || 0 - 7 || Houlton (1-0) || Asai (0-1) ||  || 13,373 || 3-2-0
|-align="center" bgcolor="#ffbbbb"
| 6 || April 9 || @Eagles || 2 - 1 || Nagai (1-0) || Otonari (0-1) || Koyama (1) || 12,418 || 3-3-0
|-align="center" bgcolor="#ffbbbb"
| 7 || April 10 || Fighters || 1 - 9 || Darvish (1-1) || Wada (1-1) ||  || 26,940 || 3-4-0
|-align="center" bgcolor="#ffbbbb"
| 8 || April 11 || Fighters || 0 - 9 || Fujii (1-1) || Takahashi (0-1) ||  || 28,306 || 3-5-0
|-align="center" bgcolor="bbffbb"
| 9 || April 12 || Fighters || 5 - 4 || Sugiuchi (1-0) || Sweeney (0-1) || Mahara (1) || 28,296 || 4-5-0
|-align="center" bgcolor="#ffbbbb"
| 10 || April 14 || Lions || 3 - 5 || Kishi (2-0) || Loe (0-2) || Graman (3) || 14,451 || 4-6-0
|-align="center" bgcolor="#bbbbbb"
| 11 || April 15 || Lions || 2 - 2 (12) || colspan=3|Game tied after 12 innings || 26,498 || 4-6-1
|-align="center" bgcolor="#ffbbbb"
| 12 || April 16 || Lions || 5 - 12 || Nishiguchi (2-0) || Otonari (0-2) || Hirano (1) || 25,538 || 4-7-1
|-align="center" bgcolor="#ffbbbb"
| 13 || April 17 || @Marines || 2 - 1 (11) || Ogino (1-0) || Settsu (0-1) ||  || 10,367 || 4-8-1
|-align="center" bgcolor="bbffbb"
| 14 || April 18 || @Marines || 4 - 7 || Kume (1-0) || Ito (0-1) || Mahara (2) || 23,225 || 5-8-1
|-align="center" bgcolor="bbffbb"
| 15 || April 19 || @Marines || 5 - 12 || Sugiuchi (2-0) || Kobayashi (0-2) ||  || 25,537 || 6-8-1
|-align="center" bgcolor="bbffbb"
| 16 || April 21 || @Fighters || 5 - 10 || Kamiuchi (2-0) || Tadano (1-2) ||  || 17,486 || 7-8-1
|-align="center" bgcolor="bbffbb"
| 17 || April 22 || @Fighters || 2 - 3 || Houlton (2-0) || Tateyama (1-1) || Mahara (3) || 19,138 || 8-8-1
|-align="center" bgcolor="#ffbbbb"
| 18 || April 23 || @Fighters || 7 - 6 || Miyanishi (2-0) || Settsu (0-2) ||  || 18,364 || 8-9-1
|-align="center" bgcolor="#ffbbbb"
| 19 || April 24 || Eagles || 2 - 3 || Nagai (2-0) || Wada (1-2) || Gwyn (1) || 27,568 || 8-10-1
|-align="center" bgcolor="bbffbb"
| 20 || April 25 || Eagles || 5 - 4 (11) || Mahara (1-0) || Asai (0-3) ||  || 31,021 || 9-10-1
|-align="center" bgcolor="#ffbbbb"
| 21 || April 26 || Eagles || 0 - 4 || Rasner (2-1) || Sugiuchi (2-1) || Koyama (2) || 31,787 || 9-11-1
|-align="center" bgcolor="#ffbbbb"
| 22 || April 28 || @Lions || 5 - 4 || Kishi (4-0) || Loe (0-3) || Onodera (1) || 16,151 || 9-12-1
|-align="center" bgcolor="#ffbbbb"
| 23 || April 29 || @Lions || 7 - 2 || Ishii (1-2) || Houlton (2-1) ||  || 28,855 || 9-13-1
|-align="center" bgcolor="bbffbb"
| 24 || April 30 || @Lions || 5 - 8 || Mizuta (1-0) || Doi (1-1) || Mahara (4) || 15,720 || 10-13-1
|-

|-align="center" bgcolor="bbffbb"
| 25 || May 1 || Marines || 6 - 2 || Wada (2-2) || Ono (1-2) ||  || 26,830 || 11-13-1
|-align="center" bgcolor="#ffbbbb"
| 26 || May 2 || Marines || 4 - 9 || Karakawa (2-2) || Arakaki (0-1) ||  || 30,239 || 11-14-1
|-align="center" bgcolor="bbffbb"
| 27 || May 3 || Marines || 7 - 2 || Sugiuchi (3-1) || Naruse (1-1) ||  || 34,040 || 12-14-1
|-align="center" bgcolor="#ffbbbb"
| 28 || May 4 || @Buffaloes || 8 - 5 || Kondo (3-1) || Loe (0-4) || Kato (6) || 30,252 || 12-15-1
|-align="center" bgcolor="#ffbbbb"
| 29 || May 5 || @Buffaloes || 2 - 1 || Kaneko (3-2) || Houlton (2-2) ||  || 31,639 || 12-16-1
|-align="center" bgcolor="bbffbb"
| 30 || May 6 || @Buffaloes || 1 - 5 || Otonari (1-2) || Yamamoto (2-1) ||  || 30,960 || 13-16-1
|-align="center" bgcolor="bbffbb"
| 31 || May 8 || Lions || 4 - 3 || Settsu (1-2) || Graman (0-2) ||  || 29,611 || 14-16-1
|-align="center" bgcolor="#ffbbbb"
| 32 || May 9 || Lions || 1 - 9 || Hoashi (1-2) || Arakaki (0-2) ||  || 30,863 || 14-17-1
|-align="center" bgcolor="bbffbb"
| 33 || May 10 || Lions || 8 - 1 || Sugiuchi (4-1) || Nogami (0-2) ||  || 30,337 || 15-17-1
|-align="center" bgcolor="#ffbbbb"
| 34 || May 12 || Marines || 1 - 2 || Naruse (2-1) || Houlton (2-3) || Ogino (4) || 25,231 || 15-18-1
|-align="center" bgcolor="#ffbbbb"
| 35 || May 13 || Marines || 0 - 7 || Omine (2-1) || Otonari (1-3) ||  || 16,242 || 15-19-1
|-align="center" bgcolor="bbffbb"
| 36 || May 14 || Marines || 5 - 4 || Falkenborg (1-0) || Ogino (1-1) ||  || 29,671 || 16-19-1
|-align="center" bgcolor="bbffbb"
| 37 || May 15 || @Eagles || 2 - 4 || Falkenborg (2-0) || Koyama (1-2) || Mahara (5) || 11,338 || 17-19-1
|-align="center" bgcolor="#ffbbbb"
| 38 || May 16 || @Eagles || 1 - 2 || Iwakuma (5-1) || Kamiuchi (2-1) ||  || 17,768 || 17-20-1
|-align="center" bgcolor="#bbbbbb"
| — || May 17 || @Eagles || colspan=6|Postponed (rained out)
|-align="center" bgcolor="#bbbbbb"
| 39 || May 19 || Tigers || 1 - 1 (12) || colspan=3|Game tied after 12 innings || 33,182 || 17-20-2
|-align="center" bgcolor="bbffbb"
| 40 || May 20 || Tigers || 3 - 2 (10) || Settsu (2-2) || Egusa (2-3) ||  || 29,258 || 18-20-2
|-align="center" bgcolor="bbffbb"
| 41 || May 22 || Carp || 6 - 3 || Wada (3-2) || Lewis (2-2) || Mahara (6) || 29,327 || 19-20-2
|-align="center" bgcolor="bbffbb"
| 42 || May 23 || Carp || 5 - 4 || Mizuta (2-0) || Saito (2-3) || Mahara (7) || 32,221 || 20-20-2
|-align="center" bgcolor="bbffbb"
| 43 || May 24 || @Swallows || 5 - 8 || Otonari (2-3) || Kawashima (3-3) ||  || 16,518 || 21-20-2
|-align="center" bgcolor="bbffbb"
| 44 || May 25 || @Swallows || 2 - 3 || Sugiuchi (5-1) || Ishikawa (6-2) || Mahara (8) || 15,555 || 22-20-2
|-align="center" bgcolor="bbffbb"
| 45 || May 27 || @Giants || 3 - 5 || Houlton (3-3) || Greisinger (5-4) || Mahara (9) || 43,050 || 23-20-2
|-align="center" bgcolor="#ffbbbb"
| 46 || May 28 || @Giants || 8 - 2 || Gonzalez (5-0) || Wada (3-3) ||  || 42,218 || 23-21-2
|-align="center" bgcolor="bbffbb"
| 47 || May 30 || Dragons || 9 - 5 || Satō (1-0) || Nagamine (1-1) ||  || 30,387 || 24-21-2
|-align="center" bgcolor="bbffbb"
| 48 || May 31 || Dragons || 5 - 4 || Falkenborg (3-0) || Takahashi (1-2) ||  || 33,231 || 25-21-2
|-

|-align="center" bgcolor="bbffbb"
| 49 || June 2 || BayStars || 7-3 || Houlton (4-3) || Mastny (0-2) ||  ||  || 26-21-2
|-align="center" bgcolor="bbffbb"
| 50 || June 3 || BayStars || 3-0 || Fujioka (1-0) || Walrond (3-4) || Mahara (10) ||  || 27-21-2
|-align="center" bgcolor="#ffbbbb"
| 51 || June 5 || @Carp || 4-1 || Mori (1-0) || Ohba (0-2) || Schultz (1) ||  || 27-22-2
|-align="center" bgcolor="bbffbb"
| 52 || June 6 || @Carp || 1-11 (6) || Germano (1-0) || Ohtake (5-2) ||  ||  || 28-22-2
|-align="center" bgcolor="#ffbbbb"
| 53 || June 7 || @Tigers || 4-3 || Williams (1-0) || Mahara (1-1) ||  ||  || 28-23-2
|-align="center" bgcolor="bbffbb"
| 54 || June 8 || @Tigers || 1-8 || Houlton (5-3) || Kubo (1-4) ||  ||  || 29-23-2
|-align="center" bgcolor="bbffbb"
| 55 || June 10 || Swallows || 4-2 || Fujioka || Yoshinori (2-4) || Mahara (11) ||  || 30-23-2
|-align="center" bgcolor="#ffbbbb"
| 56 || June 11 || Swallows || 3-6 || Tateyama || Satō || Lim ||  || 30-24-2
|-align="center" bgcolor="bbffbb"
| 57 || June 13 || Giants || 3-1 || Germano || Utsumi || Mahara (12) ||  || 31-24-2
|-align="center" bgcolor="bbffbb"
| 58 || June 14 || Giants || 5-1 || Sugiuchi || Tohno ||  ||  || 32-24-2
|-align="center" bgcolor="bbffbb"
| 59 || June 16 || @Dragons || 3-4 (10) || Mahara || Iwase || Falkenborg ||  || 33-24-2
|-align="center" bgcolor="#ffbbbb"
| 60 || June 17 || @Dragons || 3-1 || Ogasawara || Fujioka || Iwase ||  || 33-25-2
|-align="center" bgcolor="bbffbb"
| 61 || June 20 || @BayStars || 7-11 || Germano || Glynn ||  ||  || 36-25-2
|-align="center" bgcolor="bbffbb"
| 62 || June 21 || @BayStars || 5-0 || Sugiuchi || Miura ||  ||  || 37-25-2
|-align="center" bgcolor="#ffbbbb"
| 63 || June 26 || @Lions || 10-4 || Wakui || Fujioka ||  ||  || 37-26-2
|-align="center" bgcolor="bbffbb"
| 64 || June 27 || @Lions || 3-10 || Sugiuchi || Ishii ||  ||  || 38-26-2
|-align="center" bgcolor="bbffbb"
| 65 || June 28 || @Lions || 5-7 || Falkenborg || Mitsui || Mahara ||  || 39-26-2
|-align="center" bgcolor="bbffbb"
| 66 || June 30 || Buffaloes || 13-2 || Ohtonari || Kondoh ||  ||  || 40-26-2
|-

|-align="center" bgcolor="#bbbbbb"
| — || July 1 || Buffaloes || colspan=6|Postponed (rained out)
|-
| 67 || July 2 || Buffaloes || || || || || ||
|-
| 68 || July 4 || @Fighters || || || || || ||
|-
| 69 || July 5 || @Fighters || || || || || ||
|-
| 70 || July 7 || @Buffaloes || || || || || ||
|-
| 71 || July 8 || @Buffaloes || || || || || ||
|-
| 72 || July 9 || @Buffaloes || || || || || ||
|-
| 73 || July 10 || Eagles || || || || || ||
|-
| 74 || July 11 || Eagles || || || || || ||
|-
| 75 || July 12 || Eagles || || || || || ||
|-
| 76 || July 14 || Fighters || || || || || ||
|-
| 77 || July 15 || Fighters || || || || || ||
|-
| 78 || July 16 || Fighters || || || || || ||
|-
| 79 || July 17 || @Marines || || || || || ||
|-
| 80 || July 18 || @Marines || || || || || ||
|-
| 81 || July 19 || @Marines || || || || || ||
|-
| 82 || July 20 || Eagles || || || || || ||
|-
| 83 || July 21 || Eagles || || || || || ||
|-
| 84 || July 22 || Eagles || || || || || ||
|-
| 85 || July 28 || Buffaloes || || || || || ||
|-
| 86 || July 29 || Buffaloes || || || || || ||
|-
| 87 || July 30 || Buffaloes || || || || || ||
|-
| 88 || July 31 || @Fighters || || || || || ||
|-

|-
| 89 || August 1 || @Fighters || || || || ||
|-
| 90 || August  2 || @Fighters || || || || ||
|-
| 91 || August 4 || Marines || || || || || ||
|-
| 92 || August 5 || Marines || || || || || ||
|-
| 93 || August 6 || Marines || || || || || ||
|-
| 94 || August 7 || @Lions || || || || || ||
|-
| 95 || August 8 || @Lions || || || || || ||
|-
| 96 || August 9 || @Lions || || || || || ||
|-
| 97 || August 11 || @Eagles || || || || || ||
|-
| 98 || August 12 || @Eagles || || || || || ||
|-
| 99 || August 13 || @Eagles || || || || || ||
|-
| 100 || August 14 || @Buffaloes || || || || || ||
|-
| 101 || August 15 || @Buffaloes || || || || || ||
|-
| 102 || August 16 || @Buffaloes || || || || || ||
|-
| 103 || August 18 || Lions || || || || || ||
|-
| 104 || August 19 || Lions || || || || || ||
|-
| 105 || August 20 || Lions || || || || || ||
|-
| 106 || August 21 || Fighters || || || || || ||
|-
| 107 || August 22 || Fighters || || || || || ||
|-
| 108 || August 23 || Fighters || || || || || ||
|-
| 109 || August 25 || @Marines || || || || || ||
|-
| 110 || August 26 || @Marines || || || || || ||
|-
| 111 || August 27 || @Marines || || || || || ||
|-
| 112 || August 28 || @Fighters || || || || || ||
|-
| 113 || August 29 || @Fighters || || || || || ||
|-
| 114 || August 30 || @Fighters || || || || || ||
|-

|-
| 115 || September 1 || Buffaloes || || || || || ||
|-
| 116 || September 2 || Buffaloes || || || || || ||
|-
| 117 || September 3 || Buffaloes || || || || || ||
|-
| 118 || September 4 || Lions || || || || || ||
|-
| 119 || September 5 || Lions || || || || || ||
|-
| 120 || September 6 || Lions || || || || || ||
|-
| 121 || September 8 || @Marines || || || || || ||
|-
| 122 || September 9 || @Marines || || || || || ||
|-
| 123 || September 10 || @Marines || || || || || ||
|-
| 124 || September 11 || Eagles || || || || || ||
|-
| 125 || September 12 || Eagles || || || || || ||
|-
| 126 || September 13 || Eagles || || || || || ||
|-
| 127 || September 15 || @Buffaloes || || || || || ||
|-
| 128 || September 16 || @Buffaloes || || || || || ||
|-
| 129 || September 17 || @Buffaloes || || || || || ||
|-
| 130 || September 18 || @Lions || || || || || ||
|-
| 131 || September 19 || @Lions || || || || || ||
|-
| 132 || September 20 || @Lions || || || || || ||
|-
| 133 || September 21 || Marines || || || || || ||
|-
| 134 || September 22 || Marines || || || || || ||
|-
| 135 || September 23 || Marines || || || || || ||
|-
| 136 || September 25 || Fighters || || || || || ||
|-
| 137 || September 26 || Fighters || || || || || ||
|-
| 138 || September 27 || Fighters || || || || || ||
|-
| 139 || September 29 || @Eagles || || || || || ||
|-
| 140 || September 30 || @Eagles || || || || || ||
|-

|-
| 141 || October 1 || @Eagles || || || || || ||
|-align="center" bgcolor="#bbbbbb"
| — || October 2 || @Eagles ||  colspan=6|Postponed (rained out)
|-
| 142 || October 4 || @Fighters || || || || || ||
|-
| 143 || October 6 || Buffaloes || || || || || ||
|-
| 144 || October 11 || @Eagles || || || || || ||
|-
| PLCS Game 1 || October 16 || @Eagles || || || || || ||
|-
| PLCS Game 2 || October 17 || @Eagles || || || || || ||
|-

Player stats

Batting

Pitching

References

Fukuoka SoftBank Hawks
Fukuoka SoftBank Hawks seasons